Santana (Mark Sanchez, born February 4, 1991) and Ortiz (Miguel Molina, born September 27, 1991), sometimes nicknamed Proud & Powerful, are an American professional wrestling tag team currently signed to All Elite Wrestling (AEW), but the team is currently on hiatus due to Santana suffering a knee injury.

In 2012, Molina and Sanchez, then known as Angel Ortiz and Mike Draztik respectively, formed a tag team known as EYFBO (acronym for Entertain Your Fucking Balls Off or Entertain Your Freakin Butt Off) and worked for several years on the American independent  scene. They won several titles, including the AAW Tag Team Championship, CZW World Tag Team Championship and the HOG Tag Team Championship.

In 2017, they were hired by Impact Wrestling, and changed their names to Ortiz and Santana. They joined Konnan as the members of the stable The Latin American Xchange (LAX) and became a big part of the promotion's tag team division. During their time in Impact, they were four time Impact World Tag Team Champions, holding the record for most combined days as champions, with 662 days and, at one point, the record as the longest reign with 261 days. They also won GFW Tag Team Championship and unified the title with the Impact Tag Team Championship. Santana and Ortiz left the promotion in 2019 and, soon after, joined the newly created All Elite Wrestling, where they joined Chris Jericho's stable The Inner Circle. After a dispute in The Inner Circle, they left and teamed up with Eddie Kingston where they now compete in an ongoing feud against The Jericho Appreciation Society.

History

Impact Wrestling (2017–2019) 

On the March 16, 2017 episode of Impact Wrestling, Santana and Ortiz were part of LAX with Homicide, Diamante, and manager Konnan. LAX attacked Decay, Laredo Kid, Garza Jr., and Reno Scum inserting themselves in the Impact World Tag Team Championship picture and winning them the following week, establishing themselves as heels in the process. On the March 30 episode of Impact Wrestling, Ortiz and Santana defeated Decay, Laredo Kid and Garza Jr. and Reno Scum to win the Impact World Tag Team Championship. On the April 23 episode of Impact Wrestling, Santana and Ortiz defeated Veterans of War (Mayweather and Wilcox) in a tournament finals to win the GFW Tag Team Championship. On November 5 at Bound for Glory, they lost to Ohio Versus Everything (OVE) as part of a double turn with Sami Callihan interfering on OVE's behalf, Jake Crist performing a low blow on Ortiz, and OVE attacking them after the match, thus turning LAX into face in the process.

On the May 24, 2018 episode of Impact King became the newest member of LAX. After the group leader Konnan was attacked, and Homicide and Diamante went missing in action, King assumed leadership of the faction and guided Ortiz and Santana back to being tag team champions. In June, Konnan and Diamante returned, both showing suspicion about King's involvement with the group. On the July 5, 2018 episode of Impact, Konnan confronted King who admitted that it was he who had "taken out a hit" against Konnan to takeover the faction. King then attempted to get Ortiz and Santana to recognize him as the new head of the group but they rejected this and stood beside the original leader, Konnan. Then, former LAX members Hernandez and Homicide returned, entering the ring and attacking Konnan's trio. At Bound for Glory on October 14, Hernandez and Homicide lost to Ortiz and Santana in a Concrete Jungle Death match.

On January 12, 2019, The Lucha Bros (Pentagón Jr. and Rey Fénix) defeated LAX during the TV Tapings in Mexico to win the Impact World Tag Team Championships. Santana and Ortiz would reclaim them at the Rebellion pay per view on April 28. They held the titles until July, when they lost them to The North (Ethan Page and Josh Alexander).

On July 8, it was revealed that Santana and Ortiz would soon be leaving Impact and had interest from WWE and All Elite Wrestling. During August 9  tapings Santana and Ortiz were given a "send off" by the Impact locker room. Santana confirmed the following day that he and Ortiz were in fact done appearing on Impact Wrestling.

All Elite Wrestling (2019–present) 
On August 31, 2019, at All Out, Santana and Ortiz debuted as heels for All Elite Wrestling (AEW), attacking both Lucha Brothers (Pentagón Jr. and Fénix) and Nick Jackson after their tag team ladder match. On October 2, the inaugural episode of Dynamite, they teamed with Chris Jericho in the main event and defeated The Elite (Kenny Omega and The Young Bucks). Led by Jericho, they subsequently formed a new faction along with Sammy Guevara and Jake Hager called The Inner Circle. On the November 18, 2020 episode of Dynamite, Konnan reunited with Santana and Ortiz during an Inner Circle party in Las Vegas. On the February 9, 2022 episode of AEW Dynamite, the Inner Circle had a team meeting that ended with Sammy Guevara throwing his vest and walking out. It was later announced that Jericho and Hager would face Santana and Ortiz in a tag team match the following week, with it being billed as the Inner Circle Implodes match. On the March 9, 2022 episode of Dynamite, the Inner Circle was disbanded after Jericho and Hager attacked Santana and Ortiz and formed an alliance with 2point0 and Daniel Garcia. On the June 15, 2022 special episode of Dynamite Road Rager, Ortiz would have his head shaved after losing a hair vs. hair match to Jericho. On the June 29, 2022 at Blood And Guts, they would compete in the main event, defeating The Jericho Appreciation Society.

Lucha Libre AAA Worldwide (2019) 
On September 8, 2019, Santana and Ortiz debuted with the Mexican promotion Lucha Libre AAA Worldwide (AAA), earning their first victory after defeating the team of Arez and Daga and Laredo Kid and Myzteziz Jr.

Championships and accomplishments 

AAW: Professional Wrestling Redefined
AAW Tag Team Championship (1 time)
 All Elite Wrestling
 Dynamite Award (3 times)
 "Bleacher Report PPV Moment of the Year" (2021) – Stadium Stampede match (The Elite vs. The Inner Circle) – Double or Nothing (May 23)
 "Biggest Beatdown" (2021) – The Inner Circle jumping Orange Cassidy – Dynamite (June 10)
Hardest Moment to Clean Up After (2021) - (Best Friends vs Santana and Ortiz) - Dynamite (September 16)
Combat Zone Wrestling
CZW World Tag Team Championship (1 time)
House of Glory
HOG Tag Team Championship (3 times)
Impact Wrestling
GFW Tag Team Championship (1 time)
Impact World Tag Team Championship (4 times)
Tag Team of the Year (2018)
Jersey Championship Wrestling
JCW Tag Team Championships (1 time)
Latin American Wrestling Entertainment
LAWE Heavyweight Championship (1 time, current) – Santana
 Pro Wrestling Illustrated
 Faction of the Year (2021) – with The Inner Circle
 Ranked Ortiz No. 115 of the top 500 singles wrestlers in the PWI 500 in 2019
 Ranked Santana No. 119 of the top 500 singles wrestlers in the PWI 500 in 2019
Pro Wrestling Revolver 
PWR Tag Team Championship (1 time)
WrestlePro
WrestlePro Tag Team Championship (1 time)
Warriors Of Wrestling
WOW Tag Team Championship (1 time)
World Wrestling League
WWL World Tag Team Championship (1 time)

Luchas de Apuestas record

References

All Elite Wrestling personnel
All Elite Wrestling teams and stables
Impact Wrestling teams and stables
Independent promotions teams and stables
Puerto Rican male professional wrestlers
TNA/Impact World Tag Team Champions
Sportspeople from the Bronx
Entertainers from the Bronx
AAW Tag Team Champions